Islam Slimani is the all-time top goalscorer for the Algeria national football team. As of 19 November 2022, he has scored 41 goals in 91 appearances since his debut on 2 June 2012.

On 8 October 2021, Slimani scored a brace in a 6–1 heavy victory over Niger in a 2022 FIFA World Cup qualifying match to become the Algeria's all-time top scorer with 39 goals, surpassing Abdelhafid Tasfaout who held the record with 36 goals for 19 years since 2002.

International goals 

 Scores and results list Algeria's goal tally first.

 With Algeria A'

Statistics

See also 

 List of top international men's association football goal scorers by country
 List of leading goalscorers for the Algeria national football team
 Algeria national football team records and statistics

References

External links 
 

 Islam Slimani at RSSSF

Slimani
Algeria national football team
Slimani